Convoys SL 140/MKS 31 were two Allied convoys which ran during the Battle of the Atlantic in World War II. SL 140 was one of the SL convoys from the South Atlantic to Britain, and MKS 31 was one of the MKS convoys between Britain and the Mediterranean.

They were sailing together on the Gibraltar homeward route, having made a rendezvous off Gibraltar in late November 1943.

They were the subject of a U-boat attack, as part of the Kriegsmarines renewed Autumn offensive.

Background
Following the renewal of the U-boat offensive in the Atlantic, convoys on the UK/Gibraltar routes had again come under attack, leading to clashes over Convoy SL 138/MKS 28 and Convoy SL 139/MKS 30.
German U-boat Control (BdU) had subsequently re-organized its patrol lines off the coast of Portugal, so as to find and attack the next convoys on this route.
As before, the Admiralty were running these in tandem, bringing together the South Atlantic and the Mediterranean routes at Gibraltar.

Protagonists
SL 140 left Freetown on 12 November 1943, arriving off Gibraltar on 24 November. It comprised 35 ships and was escorted by an Escort Group of four warships. MKS 31 sailed from Port Said on 13 November, similarly arriving off Gibraltar on 24 November to meet SL 140.

The combined body of 65 ships then sailed for Britain.

Opposing this force was wolf pack Weddigen, consisting of thirteen U-boats, comprising boats already on station from the disbanded Schill group, with reinforcements from the North Atlantic and from bases in occupied France.

Action
The two convoys made their rendezvous at noon on 24 November 1943, a total of 65 ships initially escorted by the B-1 Escort Group, of seven warships.
The combined convoys were sighted by German aircraft in the late afternoon of 26 November, west of Cape St Vincent, but were able to evade the shadow with a radical course change during the night. The convoy was reinforced by the destroyer Watchman, also on the 26th.

She commenced shadowing until other Weddigen boats could be homed-in.
By evening the U-boats had gathered and started their assault. Franke, in U-262 was able to penetrate the escort screen into the convoy itself, he attacked the ships there from close range, a tactic used by aces Kretschmer and Schepke two to three years earlier. However his boldness was not rewarded by any success; he fired at, and claimed hits on, three ships, but no hits were confirmed. 
This brought the total number of escorts for the convoy to seventeen warships.
 
On 28 November U-238 picked up two allied airmen whose aircraft had crashed. U-238’s skipper, Horst Hepp, radioed a long account of his interrogation of them, which was intercepted and tracked by HF/DF (radio direction finding). Hepp was meanwhile ordered to meet U-764, which was returning to base, in order to transfer the prisoners. Allied forces were sent to intercept the two U-boats, with a view to rescuing the airmen, and prevent the two boats from getting away.
Both U-764 and U-238 were attacked the following day by aircraft from the escort carrier ; both were damaged, but both were able to escape.

But by now outnumbered by the convoy escort, Weddigen had little chance of achieving any success; BdU ordered a halt to the attack.

SL 140 and MKS 31 continued their passage without further incident, arriving at Liverpool on 26 November 1943.

Aftermath
Despite the energy of the attack on SL 140/MKS 31 no ships were sunk, nor U-boats destroyed. The escort had successfully beaten off every attack, although the failure to destroy any of the attacking U-boats, despite the presence of two Support Groups, was disappointing to the Allies. Franke, of U-262 received the Knight's Cross of the Iron Cross for this and previous actions on this patrol; significantly the citation commented on the toughness and tenacity shown as the reason for the award, rather than for any major success, as in previous years. BdU recognized that in this phase of the U-boat offensive "the prospects of sinkings were slight"

Notes

References
 Clay Blair : Hitler's U-Boat War [Volume 2]: The Hunted 1942–1945 (1998)  (2000 UK paperback ed.)
 Arnold Hague : The Allied Convoy System 1939–1945 (2000) ISBN (Canada) 1 55125 033 0 :   ISBN (UK) 1 86176 147 3
 Paul Kemp  : U-Boats Destroyed  ( 1997) . 
 Stephen Roskill : The War at Sea 1939–1945   Vol III (1960) . ISBN (none)

External links
SL 140/MKS 31  at convoyweb

SL140
C